Amber Fares is a Lebanese Canadian filmmaker, documentarian, director and cinematographer. She co-founded SocDoc Studios. She is based in Brooklyn and Palestine.

Biography 
Born in Canada with Lebanese roots, Fares began her secondary education at the University of Western Ontario from 1990 to 1993, graduating with a B.A. in Sociology. From 1997 to 2000, she attended the University of Calgary, receiving a M.B.A. in Marketing and International Business. After the September 11 attacks, she left her career in marketing to "deepen her understanding of life in the Middle East". In 2007, she enrolled in the film program at the Gulf Islands Film and Television School (GIFTS) located on Galiano Island. In 2009, Fares co-founded SocDoc Studios with Avi Goldstein.

Fares has also worked for the United Nations, Defence for Children International, and the British Consulate providing her videography expertise for projects such as Peace Starts Here, which is a video series for United Nations Relief and Works Agency for Palestine Refugees in the Near East (UNRWA) filmed in the West Bank, Gaza, Syria, Lebanon, and Jordan.

After Speed Sisters she went on to co-produce and was the cinematographer on the documentary The Judge that won a Peabody Award in 2019.

Speed Sisters 
Speed Sisters is Fares' first feature length documentary, following the Speed Sisters: the first all-women race car driving team in the Arab World, made up of Noor Daoud, Marah Zahalqa, Maysoon Jayyusi, Mona Ennab, and Betty Saadeh. The film is based in the West Bank, where motor car racing has gained popularity despite the Israeli occupation. Some of the Speed Sisters and other subjects speak in English, while sections with Arabic speakers have English subtitles.

Speed Sisters tackles issues such as gender in Palestine, gender in racing, and Palestinian life under occupation. The film connects the women's literal mobility through racing to opportunities for Palestinian resistance to the occupation. In the trailer for the film, one of the Speed Sisters says, "How much will we let the occupation affect our lives? What are we supposed to do, stop living?" Fares depicts racing as relief from occupation and its restrictions and limitations of movement, mobility, and freedom.

On December 1, 2014, Speed Sisters debuted as the opening film of the Doha Film Institute's Ajyal Youth Film Festival. The Huffington Post'''s E. Nina Rothe reported on the event, calling the film "cool, fast-paced, insightful and fun to watch" with an "infectious soundtrack" including music by Swedish Palestinian musician Hanouneh. Rothe continues, saying that Fares depicts "a West Bank that while surrounded by conflicts and occupations is a fully functioning, passionate world, filled with exceptional human beings. A Palestine of loving fathers, stubborn daughters.... A Palestine that is livable, not just survivable, away from the headlines and wars."

Filmography 
 Short films 
 Ghetto Town (2009)

 Feature length 
 Speed Sisters'' (2015)
The Judge (2017)

External links 
 SocDoc Studios

References 

Canadian people of Lebanese descent
Canadian documentary film directors
Living people
Canadian officials of the United Nations
University of Western Ontario alumni
University of Calgary alumni
Place of birth missing (living people)
Year of birth missing (living people)
Canadian women film directors
Canadian women documentary filmmakers